Phyllocnistis aurilinea is a moth of the family Gracillariidae, known from Colombia. The hostplants for the species include Macleania rupestris and Cissampelos rhombifolia.

References

Phyllocnistis
Endemic fauna of Colombia
Moths of South America